Vellalar College for Women, is a women's general degree college located at Thindal, Erode, Tamil Nadu. It was established in the year 1970. The college is affiliated with Bharathiar University. This college offers different courses in arts, commerce and science.

Departments

Science
Bio chemistry 
Physics
Chemistry
Mathematics
Computer Science
Botany
Zoology
Nutrition

Arts and Commerce
Tamil
English
History
Economics
Commerce

Accreditation
The college is  recognized by the University Grants Commission (UGC).

References

External links

Educational institutions established in 1970
1970 establishments in Tamil Nadu
Colleges affiliated to Bharathiar University
Education in Erode
Academic institutions formerly affiliated with the University of Madras